Turn Back Time (originally titled If I Could Turn Back Time) is a British television series produced by Hat Trick Productions for BBC One. It aired from 9 August to 13 September 2006, and was hosted by Dara Ó Briain. In the show, famous faces revealed what they regret doing, and not doing, in their life.

Ó Briain explained: "The series is a bit like This Is Your Life, but hosted by the Wizard of Oz, given that all my guests tell me the terrible things they wish they'd done differently - and then I say 'No! But you've been brave all along... ' - and I give them a medal. My guests express deep felt regrets about their lives and then we race to see who can mock them first. Sometimes I win, sometimes the guest wins, either way they get the mickey taken out of them." He continued, "Turn Back Time is basically a chat show, but where the host is really well armed. I had a lot of bullets in my gun. But that's OK. I had a bunch of flowers up my sleeve too."

Episode guide

References

2006 British television series debuts
2006 British television series endings